Giaever Ridge is a broad, snow-covered ridge, about  long in a north–south direction, on the west side of Schytt Glacier in Queen Maud Land, Antarctica. It was mapped by Norwegian cartographers from surveys and air photos by the Norwegian–British–Swedish Antarctic Expedition (1949–52) and named for John Schjelderup Giæver, leader of the expedition.

References

Ridges of Queen Maud Land
Princess Martha Coast
Princess Astrid Coast